Acid green is a shade of yellow-green. Sources differ as to the exact color, but the one shown at right is representative.

Here are some additional variations:

See also
List of colors

Shades of green